TC PipeLines, LP is a publicly traded master limited partnership. TC Energy owns 25.48% of the outstanding units and controls the general partner. TC PipeLines, LP manages and owns natural gas pipelines in the United States including 46.45% of Great Lakes Gas Transmission Limited Partnership, 50% of Northern Border Pipeline Company, 100% of Gas Transmission Northwest, and 100% of Tuscarora Gas Transmission Company. TC PipeLines, LP is based in Calgary, Alberta.

References

External links
TC Pipelines, LP official website
TransCanada official website

Companies listed on the New York Stock Exchange
Natural gas companies of Canada
Companies based in Calgary
Natural gas pipeline companies